Louise Vautour (born in Bathurst, New Brunswick) is a Canadian musician.

Career 

Vautour took music and dance lessons from an early age but only started learning the fiddle at age 13. In 2001 she moved to Dublin, Ireland to study music. She moved back to Bathurst a year later and started a fiddle school.  In 2004, she was joined the band Ode à l'Acadie. In 2012 she participated in the Festival interceltique de Lorient as the first artist to inaugurate the pavilion of Acadia. She was part of the festival twice before in 2008 and 2011. As of January 2016 she was living in Ottawa, Ontario.

Discography 
 Traces (2009)

See also 

 Festival interceltique de Lorient 
 Acadia
 Fiddle
 Bathurst, New Brunswick

References

External links 

 Louise Vautour on Myspace

Musicians from Bathurst, New Brunswick
Canadian folk fiddlers
Canadian music educators
Living people
Year of birth missing (living people)
Women music educators
21st-century Canadian violinists and fiddlers
21st-century Canadian women musicians
Canadian women violinists and fiddlers